Arcos Club de Fútbol is a Spanish football team based in Arcos de la Frontera, Cádiz, in the autonomous community of Andalusia. Founded in 1956, it plays in Tercera División - Group 10, holding home matches at Nuevo Estadio Antonio Barbadillo, with a capacity of 2,900 people.

Season to season

15 seasons in Tercera División

References

External links
Official website 
La Preferente profile 
Arefepedia profile 

 
Association football clubs established in 1956
1956 establishments in Spain
Province of Cádiz